American rock band Evanescence has recorded five studio albums, three extended plays, two demo albums, and their music has appeared on two soundtrack albums.

Lead vocalist and pianist Amy Lee and former guitarist Ben Moody founded Evanescence in 1995. Produced by Dave Fortman, their debut studio album, Fallen, was released in 2003 and yielded the singles "Bring Me to Life", "Going Under", "My Immortal", and "Everybody's Fool". In 2006, Evanescence released their second studio album, The Open Door, which included the singles "Call Me When You're Sober", "Lithium", "Sweet Sacrifice", "Good Enough". Released in 2011, their eponymous third studio album was produced by Nick Raskulinecz and spawned the singles "What You Want" and "My Heart Is Broken", and "Lost in Paradise". Evanescence marked the first time all band members co-wrote on an album. 

In March 2014, Lee confirmed that Evanescence had parted ways with long-time record label Wind-Up Records and they were now independent artists. In 2017, the band released a vinyl boxset called The Ultimate Collection, which included a B-side compilation album, Lost Whispers. Evanescence released their fourth studio album, Synthesis, in November 2017. Described as a "passion project" by Lee, the album is an orchestral and electronic re-imagining of past Evanescence songs alongside two new songs, "Imperfection" and "Hi-Lo". In 2021, the band released their fifth studio album, The Bitter Truth, preceded by the songs  "Wasted on You", "The Game is Over", "Use My Voice", and "Better Without You".

Released songs

Unreleased songs

Writing credits summary

Notes

References 

General
 
 
 

Specific

External links 
 

 
Evanescence